This is a list of Internet exchange points by size, measured by peak data rate (throughput), with additional data on location, establishment and average throughput.

Generally only exchanges with more than ten gigabits per second peak throughput have been taken into consideration. The numbers in the list represent switched traffic only (no private interconnects) and are rounded to whole gigabits. Take into consideration that traffic on each exchange point can change quickly, and be seasonal.

This list is not exhaustive, as it includes only exchanges willing to make traffic data public on their website. Particularly data of IXPs from the United States and China is hard to come by. Examples of large peering points without public data are NAP of the Americas or PacketExchange.

See also 
Autonomous system (Internet)
Border Gateway Protocol
Internet exchange point
List of Internet exchange points
Peering

Notes

External links 
Packet Clearing House – Internet Exchange Directory (automatically updated daily list)
TeleGeography: The Internet Exchange Points Directory
Euro-IX Member IXPs
 IXP Database (IXPDB) - collects data directly from IXPs through a recurring automated process (2022-11-30)
LookinGlass.Org: IXP's with BGP LG service in the World

 
Routing
exchange points

de:Internet-Knoten#Tabelle internationaler Internet-Knoten (GIX) (nach Traffic sortiert)